NEUMAN & ESSER GROUP (NEA) was founded as a family establishment in Aachen, Germany in 1830. The abbreviation, NEA, stands for "NEUMAN & ESSER in Aachen". NEA is a manufacturer of reciprocating compressors and grinding systems for several industries, including  oil and gas, chemical and petrochemical, food industry and renewable energy.

History
NEUMAN & ESSER was founded as "J. L. Neuman & Cie. Maschinenfabrik" during the Industrial Revolution.

Brothers Johann Leonard Neuman and Friedrich August Neuman started the company, "Gebrüder Neuman", in 1829, which was later renamed "J. L. Neuman & Cie. Maschinenfabrik" in 1830. This emergence founded the name of the company, known today, as "Neuman & Esser". Friedrich August Neuman also worked in boiler construction, that also still exists today, in Eschweiler, under the name "FA Neuman GmbH & Co. KG".

In the beginning, NEA produced hydraulic presses, decatizing rollers, reciprocating steam-powered engines and napping mills. Additionally, NEA serviced defective existing machines of customers. In 1888, the company moved into a new and larger production hall in the Clasenstraße, near the Aachen West railway station. In the year 1891, Oscar Peters presided as the sole owner of the machinery factory. Since then, Neuman & Esser has been owned by the Peters family. 

In the early 1900s, NEA expanded its product portfolio to include piston steam engines, reciprocating compressors, vacuums, liquid pumps and drying systems. Later, in 1930-1931, crushing plants followed. Neuman & Esser acquired the licenses for the construction of the Raymond pendulum roller mills from the insolvent company, Mehler. At the same time, NEA developed the first oil-free, dry-running compressor. The oil-free compressors became an increasingly important aspect of  brewing in the food industry as well as in the chemical industry.

In 1972, Neuman & Esser expanded its facilities to a new factory site in Übach-Palenberg 20 km away from Aachen. Providing 250 local employees jobs at the time, NEA provides over 1000 employees jobs worldwide today. This change of company headquarters enabled the opportunity to development from an individual company to a group of companies with offices in ten countries. The worldwide offices account for 3 holdings in Germany, United States and China, 3 manufacturing factories in Germany, 14 sales and applications centers in over 9 countries, and six compressor service centers in over 5 countries. These groups of companies comprise to form the name behind Neuman & Esser Group.

Controversy 
In 2017, NEUMAN & ESSER faced strong public criticism after an executive employee reported a Scottish man to the Dubai authorities for accidentally touching his hip in a crowded Dubai bar. The employee later retracted the accusation; however, NEA released a statement supporting the case against the Scotsman, who was subsequently sentenced to three months in prison. One day after the Scottish man was sentenced, it was announced, that Dubai's ruler, Sheikh Mohammed bin Rashid al-Maktoum, ordered Harron to be released.

Divisions
NEUMAN & ESSER GROUP includes divisions in sales and application centers for reciprocating compressors and grinding and classifying systems, compressor aftermarket spare parts and repairs service centers, as well as its holdings.

Reciprocating compressors
Reciprocating compressors, also called piston compressors, from NEA compress air and technical gases. Oil-free and lubricated reciprocating compressors are produced in Leipzig. The larger compressors are manufactured in Übach-Palenberg and smaller sizes are built in Wurzen. The core competence in the production of compressors has also been expanded through the acquisition of Stasskol, a manufacturer of piston rings and sealing systems.

Grinding and Classifying Systems
NEUMAN & ESSER has built grinding systems since 1930. The first product was the pendulum roller mill, which dominated the market for a long time with its particularly robust design. In 1994, NEA introduced its own impact classifier mill to the market and in 1998, the company received the patent. NEA mills are used for applications within the ceramic and chemical industries, including pigment production and processing technologies. In recent years, the areas of powder coating production, confectionery and the food industries have followed.

Aftermarket
In addition to the production of compressors and grinding systems NEUMAN & ESSER offers service. Founded in 1983, NEA separated the customer service in 1988 as NEAC Compressor Service, an independent enterprise. During the first 10 years, NEAC was a joint venture with Atlas Copco. The global sales network provided by the large partner enabled to move directly into international business. The clear split between aftermarket and new machinery business provided both greater transparency and a clear focus on the company divisions.

NEAC is the service organization for all piston compressor products of the NEUMAN & ESSER GROUP. Moreover, NEA has access to all original order documents and original drawings of the compressor brands Linde, Esslinger / GHH, Demag, Mafa Wurzen, Chicago Pneumatic, Halberg, KSB (Erhardt & Sehmer) and PPC (PENN Process Compressors). Furthermore, NEUMAN & ESSER acquired from MAN Turbo the entire division of After-Sales Service for Borsig-Berlin piston compressors built in Berlin up to the end of 1995. From 2018 to 2021 NEAC Compressor Service and Peter Brotherhood (PB) have partnered to provide service for PB's installed API 618 piston compressors.

Locations

Germany
 Übach-Palenberg (headquarters)
 Wurzen
 Mülheim an der Ruhr (Company name HOFER)
 Stassfurt (Company name STASSKOL)
 Unna (Company name ARCANUM)

Worldwide
 United States: Katy (Texas), Stratford (Connecticut)
 China: Beijing
 Brazil: Belo Horizonte, Sumare
 Italy: Milan
 India: Pune
 United Arabic Emirates: Dubai
 Egypt: Cairo
 Thailand: Rayong
 Russia: Moscow

References

External links
 Neuman & Esser website
 Stasskol website

Industrial machine manufacturers
German companies established in 1830
German brands
Engineering companies of Germany
Companies based in North Rhine-Westphalia